Tassoni is an Italian surname. Notable people with the surname include:

Alessandro Tassoni (1565–1635), Italian poet and writer
Giulio Cesare Tassoni (1859–1942), Italian general

See also
Tassone

Italian-language surnames